Catholic Child Welfare Society v Institute of the Brothers of the Christian Schools [2012] UKSC 56 is an English tort law case, concerning enterprise liability.

Facts
A group action of 170 claimants had successfully claimed that between 1958 and 1992 they were sexually abused by Brother James Carragher, and various others, at the St William’s school. The Catholic Child Welfare Society (CCWS, a charitable company, referred to as the ‘Middlesbrough defendants’) supplied the teachers and managed the school directly. The Institute of the Brothers of the Christian Schools (IBCS), an unincorporated association, also controlled where its ‘Brothers’ taught

The Court of Appeal found that the CCWS was liable, but the IBCS was not jointly liable. CCWS appealed, contending that IBCS should also be vicariously liable.

Judgment
The Supreme Court found the IBCS was jointly liable because it formed part of the whole.

See also
English tort law

Notes

References

English contract case law
United Kingdom labour case law